Pseudoceros dimidiatus, the divided flatworm or tiger flatworm, is a species of flatworm in the genus Pseudoceros, belonging to the family Pseudocerotidae.

Description 

The body is elongated and oval, with a velvety dorsal surface, a grey-black ventral side and quite short pseudo tentacles formed by folds of the anterior margin.

All individuals of the divided flatworm have a black body with an orange margin. Common characters are also two wide longitudinal yellow-greenish stripes usually separated by a narrow black median line. However, this species of Pseudoceros is highly variable in color and in pattern, in terms of the arrangement and width of the various transverse stripes and of the width of the longitudinal stripes. It can take at least three different types of liveries. It has bilateral symmetry.

The bright and contrasting colors serve as a warning for predators to not eat this inedible species. These flatworms feed exclusively on colonial ascidians. They are also cold blooded.

Distribution
This species is widespread in the Indian Ocean from the Red Sea to Australia and in the Western Pacific Ocean.

Reproduction
The Divided flatworm can reproduce both asexually, by dividing itself, and sexually. The species is a hermaphrodite, meaning that they have both male and female reproductive organs. When two flatworms reproduce they battle to decide who gets to fertilize and who is fertilized. The winner gets to act as the male, fertilizing the other.

Habitat 
The divided flatworm lives in coral reefs in the tropical waters.

Bibliography 
 Leslie Newman et Lester Cannon, Marine Flatworms, 2003
 Neville Coleman, La vie marine des Maldives, 2004
 http://diveadvisor.com/sub2o/fantastic-flatworms

Original text
 Kent : The Great Barrier Reef of Australia; its products and potentialities. W.H. Allen, London (Full text).

References 
Marine Animal Encyclopedia - Divided Flatworms
WoRMS
Life Desk
Discover Life

External links
 

Turbellaria
Animals described in 1893